Gérard "Jabby" Crombac (7 March 1929, Zurich – 18 November 2005, Paris) was a Swiss auto-racing journalist and author.

Biography
In 1954 Crombac bought the Lotus Mark VI previously owned by Lotus founder Colin Chapman and began racing with this car. While this marked the start of a long friendship with Chapman, Crombac realised he was not racing driver material, and stood down in 1958.

In 1959 he began managing the interests of Jo Schlesser in association with Jean Lucas, while working for French discount retailer Prisunic.

In 1962 Crombac partnered with Lucas to found the French magazine Sport Auto, where he was chief editor until 1989. In 1973 he and a Sport Auto team composed of Thierry Lalande, Luc Melua and Jean-Louis Moncet, assembled a kitcar in one week-end.

He shared an apartment in Paris with racer Jim Clark during the time that Clark listed his official residence as Switzerland for tax purposes.

Crombac and his wife Catherine had a son, who was named Colin James in honour of close friends Chapman and Clark.

Crombac died from cancer in a hospice in Paris on 18 November 2005. His funeral was held on 28 November 2005 at the Crematorium in Père Lachaise Cemetery in Paris. In August 2007, in accordance with his wishes, his ashes were scattered in the Gulf of Saint-Tropez.

Publications

Biography/autobiography

Racing and racing cars

Road cars

References

External links
 
 
 

Motoring journalists
Formula One journalists and reporters
Swiss motorsport people
1929 births
2005 deaths